American rapper Hopsin has released five studio albums, two mixtapes, 51 singles (including eleven as a featured artist) and 57 music videos. After signing with Ruthless Records in 2007, Hopsin released his debut studio album entitled, Gazing at the Moonlight, in October 2009. The album was a commercial failure, selling only 42 copies in its first week. Shortly before his departure from Ruthless, Hopsin formed a new label, Funk Volume, with Damien Ritter and released a mixtape with SwizZz entitled, Haywire, and his second studio album, Raw, in 2009 and 2010, respectively. The album spawned the singles: "Nocturnal Rainbows" and "Sag My Pants", with the latter single being certified gold by RIAA.

Hopsin later became popular on YouTube with his "Ill Mind" series which later helped him increase his popularity online. "Ill Mind of Hopsin 4" and "5" was released which the latter single being certified gold by RIAA. Hopsin released his third studio album, Knock Madness, in 2013, to generally positive reviews. The album entered at number 132 on the US Billboard 200 and later rose to number 76 the following week. The album spawned the singles: "Ill Mind Six: Old Friend", "Hop Is Back", and "Rip Your Heart Out". His fourth studio album, Pound Syndrome, was released in July 2015, and entered the Billboard 200 at number 17. The album spawned the singles: "Ill Mind of Hopsin 7", "Crown Me", "Fly" and "Fort Collins".

Hopsin released, "Ill Mind of Hopsin 8", in March 2016, which saw Hopsin leave his label, Funk Volume, after ongoing business issues and financial disputes with co-founder, Damien Ritter. After his departure from the label, Hopsin created a new label, Undercover Prodigy, and released numerous singles with the label. His fifth studio album, No Shame, was released in November 2017, with 300 Entertainment and entered the Billboard 200 at number 42. The album spawned the singles: "The Purge", "Happy Ending", "Witch Doctor" and "Ill Mind of Hopsin 9".

Albums

Studio albums

Mixtapes

Singles

As lead artist

As featured artist

Guest appearances

Music videos

Notes

References

Hip hop discographies
Discographies of American artists